The 2006–07 WNBL season was the 27th season of competition since its establishment in 1981. A total of 8 teams contested the league. The regular season was played between October 2006 and March 2007, followed by a post-season involving the top five in March 2007.

Broadcast rights were held by free-to-air network ABC. ABC broadcast one game a week, at 1:00PM at every standard time in Australia.

Molten provided equipment including the official game ball, with Hoop2Hoop supplying team apparel.

Team standings

Finals

Season award winners

Statistics leaders

References

 https://web.archive.org/web/20141227122005/http://www.wnbl.com.au/fileadmin/user_upload/Media_Guide/12284_BASKAUST_WNBL_MEDIA_GUIDE_2014-15_BACK.pdf

2006-07
2006–07 in Australian basketball
Aus
basketball
basketball